The Glennville Adobe is a California Historical Landmark number 495 in Kern County, California. The house is the oldest in Kern County, built about 1858. The adobe became a California State Historical Landmark No. 495 on October 17, 1951. The house is located at 7977 Highway 155, Woody, California. The house was built by Thomas Fitzgerald.  Fitzgerald owned a trading post nearby on an Indian trail when he built the adobe brick house.  Since the 1950s the Glennville Adobe has been used as a Fire Department substation. Woody is a small town 7 miles west of the larger town of Glennville, California, north of Bakersfield, California.

 California State Historical Landmark reads:
NO. 495 GLENNVILLE ADOBE - This is Kern County's oldest residence, built before the Civil War by Thomas Fitzgerald as a trading post at the junction of two Indian trails. The present Greenhorn Road follows the east-west trail (later the McFarland Toll Road) to the Kern River mining districts. The town was named in 1857 after James Madison Glenn, an early settler.

See also
California Historical Landmarks in Kern County
California Historical Landmark

References

California Historical Landmarks